General elections were held in Khyber Pakhtunkhwa on Wednesday, 25 July 2018 to elect the 51 members of 15th National Assembly from Khyber Pakhtunkhwa. The Pakistan Tehreek-e-Insaf (PTI) obtained a landslide victory in the province by winning 37 general seats and increased their margin of victory from 2013. The PTI also won 8 out of 10 reserved seats while the Pakistan Muslim League (N) (PML-N) and Muttahida Majlis-e-Amal (MMA) won 1 reserved seat each.

Background 
In the 2013 elections, the PTI emerged as the largest party in the province. The Pashtun nationalist and socialist Awami National Party (ANP) was reduced to only 1 seat because of allegations of corruption and poor leadership.

In 2017, Jamaat-e-Islami (JI) and Jamiat Ulema-e-Islam (F) (JUI-F) announced to restore Muttahida Majlis-e-Amal, an electoral alliance of  Islamist Parties. This alliance was created to reduce vote bank of the PTI.

In May 2018, JI pulled out its support for the PTI-led provincial government just before the General Elections. They blamed the PTI for the fact that  JI was asked for support in the elections for the Chairman of the Senate. This statement was strongly condemned by the PTI.

Imran Khan, the chairman of the PTI, showed support for a merger of the Federally Administered Tribal Areas (FATA) with Khyber Pakhtunkhwa. He also demanded to close the FATA Secretariat and also threatened to start a countrywide protest if FATA was not merged. The goal of merging FATA with Khyber Pakhtunkhwa was to ensure the function of Law enforcement authorities like the Judiciary and Police, Bureaucracy and other Provincial and Federal institutions like Health, Local Government, and Education may also function in the region like in the rest of Pakistan.

JUI(F) strongly condemned this merger but many political parties including the people of Khyber Pakhtunkhwa showed support for a future merger.

In May 2018, FATA was merged with Khyber Pakhtunkhwa with the approval of legislators in the Parliament, Provincial Assembly and the President.

The seats for Khyber Pakhtunkhwa in the National Assembly were increased from 35 to 39 general seats and from 8 to 10 reserved seats for women due to the 2017 Census of Pakistan.  After the merger of FATA with the province, its seats were further increased to 51.

Campaign 
After the dissolution of the National Assembly and the Provincial Assembly, political parties started their election campaigns in Khyber Pakhtunkhwa.

Pakistan Tehreek-e-Insaf 
Pakistan Tehreek-e-Insaf (PTI) launched its campaign in Khyber Pakhtunkhwa by contesting every seat except for NA-50 (South Waziristan-II). Imran Khan, the chairman of the PTI, announced that he would be contesting from NA-35 (Bannu). The PTI also expelled 20 MPAs from the party for selling their votes in the Senate Elections, which increased their popularity. The PTI enjoyed massive crowds in their political rallies in Peshawar, Mardan, Swabi, Charsadda, Swat, Bannu, Abbottabad and Haripur. Opinion surveys showed that the PTI would emerge highly successful in not only Khyber Pakhtunkhwa, but also in Hazara Division, which was considered as a strong hold of the PML(N).

Muttahida Majlis-e-Amal 
Muttahida Majlis-e-Amal (MMA) started its campaign by contesting 47 seats in the province. Fazal-ur-Rehman, president of the MMA, contested from NA-38 (Dera Ismail Khan-I) and NA-39 (Dera Ismail Khan-II), while Siraj-ul Haq, leader of Jamaat-e-Islami (JI) and Deputy Leader of the MMA, contested from NA-7 (Lower Dir-II). In NA-3 (Swat-II), the MMA announced its support for Shehbaz Sharif, a candidate of the PML(N).

The MMA held large political rallies in Malakand and Peshawar.

Pakistan Muslim League (Nawaz) 
The Pakistan Muslim League (N) (PML(N)) contested 42 seats. Shehbaz Sharif, leader of the PML(N), contested NA-3 (Swat-II) and Provincial President Amir Muqam contested NA-2 (Swat-I) and NA-29 (Peshawar-III).

The PML(N) held rallies in Mardan, Swat, Mansehra and Haripur.

Awami National Party 
The Awami National Party (ANP), a Pashtun nationalist and socialist party, contested 41 Seats in the province under the leadership of Asfandyar Wali Khan. Khan Contested NA-24 (Charsadda-II) while other seniors leaders, such as Ghulam Ahmed Bilour and Haider Khan Hoti contested from NA-31 (Peshawar-V) and NA-21 (Mardan-II), respectively.

Other Political Parties 
Other smaller and regional parties also launched their campaigns a well. Aftab Ahmed Sherpao, leader of the Qaumi Watan Party (QWP), contested from NA-23 (Charsadda-I). Bilawal Bhutto Zardari, the chairman of the Pakistan People’s Party (PPP), contested from NA-8 (Malakand).

For the first time, political parties started campaigns in the former Tribal Districts. The people living in these districts gave positive response to political workers and National Assembly candidates.

Results

By constituency

Notable Loses 
Results from Khyber Pakhtunkhwa surprised the country as many Party Leaders and famous politicians lost by huge margin.

Fazal-ur-Rehman Leader of Jamiat Ulema-e-Islam F and President of Muttahida Majlis-e-Amal lost from both NA-38 and NA-39 Dera Ismail Khan by 35,236 and 27,345 votes by Pakistan Tehreek-e-Insaf Candidates.

Shebaz Sharif Leader of Pakistan Muslim League N lost from NA-3 Swat by 45,522 votes by Pakistan Tehreek-e-Insaf candidate.

Bilawal Zardari Bhutto Leader of Pakistan People's Party lost from NA-8 Malakand by 37,697 votes by  Pakistan Tehreek-e-Insaf candidate.

Asfand Yar Wali Leader of Awami National Party and Grandson of Abdul Ghaffar Khan lost from NA-24 Charsadda by 23,787 votes by Pakistan Tehreek-e-Insaf candidate.

Ghulam Ahmed Bilour another prominent Leader of Awami National Party lost from NA-31 Peshawar by 45,449 votes by Pakistan Tehreek-e-Insaf candidate.

Siraj ul Haq Leader of Jamat-e-Islami and deputy Leader of Muttahida Majlis-e-Amal lost from the strong hold of NA-7 Lower Dir by 16,114 votes by Pakistan tehreek-e-Insaf Candidate.

Amir Muqam President of Pakistan Muslim League N Khyber Pakhtunkhwa Chapter lost from both NA-2 Swat and NA-29 Peshawar by 20,468 votes and stood 4th in NA-29 Peshawar by Pakistan Tehreek-e-Insaf Candidates.

Aftab Sherpao Leader of Qaumi Watan Party lost from NA-23 Charsadda by Pakistan Tehreek-e-Insaf Candidate and stood on 3rd Position.

Atif Khan Provincial Minister of Khyber Pakhtunkhwa and one of the leaders of Pakistan Tehreek-e-Insaf lost from NA-21 Mardan by Awami National Party Candidate and former Chief Minister Haider Hoti by just 152 votes.

Akram Durani former Chief Minister of Khyber Pakhtunkhwa and one of the leaders of Muttahida Majlis-e-Amal lost from NA-35 Bannu by 7001 votes by Pakistan Tehreek-e-Insaf Leader Imran Khan.

References 

Khyber Pakhtunkhwa
Elections in Khyber Pakhtunkhwa
2018 in Khyber Pakhtunkhwa
July 2018 events in Pakistan